= Michael Mountain =

Mountain in West Virginia, United States

Coordinates: 38°17′25″N 79°54′14″W

Michael Mountain is a summit in West Virginia, in the United States. With an elevation of 3,678 feet (1,121 m), Michael Mountain is the 164th highest summit in the state of West Virginia.

The peak was named after Michael Daughtery, a pioneer who was killed in a bear attack.
